Oksenøya or Uksenøya is an island in the Sunnmøre region of Møre og Romsdal county, Norway. The island is located in Ålesund Municipality on the north side of the Storfjorden. This is the largest island in Ålesund Municipality.

The island was originally part of the old Borgund Municipality, and was later split between Ålesund and  Skodje. After the 2020 local government reforms, the island is located entirely in the new Ålesund municipality. It is home to the villages of Spjelkavik, Myrland, Løvika and Valle.

The European route E39 and European route E136 highways run across the island.

See also
List of islands of Norway

References

Ålesund
Islands of Møre og Romsdal